13-Tehri Legislative Assembly constituency is one of the seventy electoral Uttarakhand Legislative Assembly constituencies of Uttarakhand state in India.

Tehri Legislative Assembly constituency is a part of Tehri Garhwal (Lok Sabha constituency).

Members of Legislative Assembly

Election results

2022

See also

 Tehri
 Tehri Garhwal district

References

External link
  

Tehri Garhwal district
Assembly constituencies of Uttarakhand
New Tehri